Open Arms is a Mediterranean rescue vessel operated by the Proactiva Open Arms NGO.

It is 36.9 meters long and 9.5 meters wide. Before 2018, it was named Ibaizabal Tres.

In November 2018, a joint campaign was launched by Proactive Open Arms, SOS Méditerranée and Sea-Watch, which used Open Arms, Mare Jonio and Sea-Watch 3, along with the Moonbird aircraft, to continue with the rescue of refugees in the Mediterranean. This followed after a few weeks during which the states had prevented them from acting in various ways.

References 

Ships
European migrant crisis